The British League Knockout Cup was a speedway Knockout Cup competition in the United Kingdom governed by the Speedway Control Board (SCB) in conjunction with the British Speedway Promoters' Association (BSPA), that was staged between 1965 and 1994. The teams from the top division of league racing, the British League, took part. A similar competition was held for clubs in leagues that succeeded the British League, including the Elite League Knockout Cup and the Premier League Knockout Cup.

Rules
This competition was run on the knockout principle; teams drawn together race home and away matches, with the aggregate score deciding the result. In the event of the aggregate score being level, the teams again race home and away.

Winners

* The first leg of the final at Cradley was drawn, and the second leg at Oxford was cancelled due to bad weather. The official result was declared a draw and both teams shared the Knockout Cup that year.

See also
Knockout Cup (speedway) for full list of winners and competitions

References

External links
BSPA Website

Speedway competitions in the United Kingdom